There are several elementary schools in the United States named Fremont Elementary School:

 Fremont Elementary School, Santa Ana, California
 Fremont Elementary School (Mundelein, Illinois)
 Fremont Elementary School, Sunset, Utah 
 Fremont Elementary School, Alhambra, California
 Fremont Elementary School (Battle Creek, Michigan)